In the area of modern algebra known as group theory, the Rudvalis group Ru is a sporadic simple group of order
   214335371329
 = 145926144000
 ≈ 1.

History
Its Schur multiplier has order 2, and its outer automorphism group is trivial.

In 1982 Robert Griess showed that Ru cannot be a subquotient of the monster group.  Thus it is one of the 6 sporadic groups called the pariahs.

Properties 

The Rudvalis group acts as a rank 3 permutation group on 4060 points, with one point stabilizer being the Ree group 
2F4(2), the automorphism group of the Tits group. This representation implies a strongly regular graph srg(4060, 2304, 1328, 1208). That is, each vertex has 2304 neighbors and 1755 non-neighbors, any two adjacent vertices have 1328 common neighbors, while any two non-adjacent ones have 1208 .

Its double cover acts on a 28-dimensional lattice over the Gaussian integers. The lattice has 4×4060 minimal vectors; if minimal vectors are identified whenever one is 1, i, –1, or –i times another, then the 4060 equivalence classes can be identified with the points of the rank 3 permutation representation. Reducing this lattice modulo the principal ideal

gives an action of the Rudvalis group on a 28-dimensional vector space over the field  with 2 elements.  Duncan (2006) used the 28-dimensional lattice to construct a vertex operator algebra acted on by the double cover.

 characterized the Rudvalis group by the centralizer of a central involution.  gave another characterization as part of their identification of the Rudvalis group as one of the quasithin groups.

Maximal subgroups 
 found the 15 conjugacy classes of maximal subgroups of Ru as follows:

 2F4(2) = 2F4(2)'.2
 26.U3(3).2
 (22 × Sz(8)):3
 23+8:L3(2)
 U3(5):2
 21+4+6.S5
 PSL2(25).22
 A8
 PSL2(29)
 52:4.S5
 3.A6.22
 51+2:[25]
 L2(13):2
 A6.22
 5:4 × A5

References

External links
 MathWorld: Rudvalis Group
 Atlas of Finite Group Representations: Rudvalis group

Sporadic groups